Amara alpestris is a species of beetle of the genus Amara in the family Carabidae that is native to Asia.

Subspecies
There are seven subspecies of A. alpestris: 
 Amara alpestris alpestris A. Villa & G.B. Villa, 1833
 Amara alpestris baldensis K. & J. Daniel, 1898
 Amara alpestris bonomii Holdhaus, 1942
 Amara alpestris dolomitana K. & J. Daniel, 1898
 Amara alpestris interjecta Holdhaus, 1942
 Amara alpestris munda Holdhaus, 1942
 Amara alpestris pasubiana K. & J. Daniel, 1898

References

alpestris
Beetles of Asia
Beetles described in 1833